Zabrus ambiguus is a species of ground beetle in the Iberozabrus subgenus that is endemic to Spain.

Beetles described in 1838
Beetles of Europe
Endemic fauna of Spain
Zabrus
Taxa named by Jules Pierre Rambur